Metallum Nostrum is a cover album by German power metal band Powerwolf, originally released on 17 July 2015 as a bonus disc to Blessed & Possessed. It was re-released separately on 11 January 2019.

Track listing

Personnel

Musicians 
 Attila Dorn – vocals
 Matthew Greywolf – guitars
 Charles Greywolf – guitars, bass
 Roel van Helden – drums, percussion
 Falk Maria Schlegel – organ, keyboards

Additional personnel 
 Jens Bogren – mastering
 Sam Braun – engineer
 David Buballa – engineer
 Charles Greywolf – engineer
 Matthew Greywolf – artwork, layout
 Kristian "Kohle" Kohlmannslehner – engineer
 Manuela Meyer – photography
 Fredrik Nordström – mixing
 Henrik Udd – mixing

Charts

References 

Powerwolf albums
2019 albums